Fourchambault is a commune in the Nièvre department in central France.

Geography

Fourchambault lies on the right, eastern bank of the river Loire, about 7 km northwest of Nevers. Fourchambault station has rail connections to Nevers, Cosne-sur-Loire and Paris. The A77 autoroute (Montargis–Nevers) passes east of the town.

Demographics

Industrial history

In 1819 Boigues & Fils, iron merchant in Paris, and M. Labbé, decided to find a new site on the Loire for their iron foundry to which it would be easier to transport coal, and decided on Fourchambault.
A dock was built for cargo boats, and the Loire provided water for the steam engines.
Construction of the factory at Fourchambault began in 1821.
The Charbonnières Raveaux and Cramain furnaces became annexes to the new building, and Boigues & Fils collected several furnaces from Nivernais and Berry. 
Manufacturing began in 1822.
Almost 3,000 workers from the surrounding countryside were employed in the cast iron foundry.

The Société de Commentry, Fourchambault et Decazeville was formed in 1853 through a merger of the Fourchambault foundry, Imphy (Nièvre) steelworks, Montluçon (Allier) foundry and Commentry (Allier) colliery.
In 1954 the company was renamed the Société métallurgique d'Imphy.
In 1968 it was merged with the Société des forges et aciéries du Creusot, which in 1971 became Creusot-Loire.
The combined company was in turn absorbed by Creusot-Loire (Saône-et-Loire) in 1971.
The Creusot-Loire group was liquidated in December 1984.

See also
 Communes of the Nièvre department

References

Sources

Communes of Nièvre